Tonciu may refer to several villages in Romania:

 Tonciu, a village in Galații Bistriței Commune, Bistrița-Năsăud County
 Tonciu, a village in Fărăgău Commune, Mureș County

See also

Tonči